Jackhole Productions is an American production company started by Jimmy Kimmel, Daniel Kellison and Adam Carolla. It has produced several comedy shows on television. Jackhole Productions has worked on several projects with production company DiGa. The company's name is an amalgam of Carolla and Kellison's company Jackhouse, and Kimmel's company Cashhole. It is also a made up swear word. The mascot is an animated donkey wearing a sombrero. In early 2020, Kimmel's new production company, Kimmelot, assumed production responsibilities for Jimmy Kimmel Live!; it is not known if this is due to a merger between Jackhole and Kimmelot.

Former shows produced by Jackhole Productions:
 The Man Show (Comedy Central) (1999–2004, only used on seasons 1-5)
 Jimmy Kimmel Live! (ABC) (2003–2020, now produced under Kimmelot banner)
 Gerhard Reinke's Wanderlust (Comedy Central) (2003)
 Too Late with Adam Carolla (Comedy Central) (2005)
 The Adam Carolla Project (TLC) (2005)
 The Andy Milonakis Show (MTV, MTV2) (2005–2007)
 Crank Yankers (Comedy Central, MTV2) (2002–2007)
 Sports Show with Norm Macdonald (Comedy Central) (2011)

Movies that were produced by Jackhole Productions:
 Windy City Heat (Comedy Central) (2003)

References

Mass media companies of the United States